Precision Performance Motorsports (PPM) is an American professional sports car racing and former stock car racing team that currently competes full-time in the WeatherTech SportsCar Championship using a GT Daytona-class Lamborghini Huracán GT3 Evo. In stock car racing, the team was known for competing in the NASCAR Xfinity Series and the K&N Pro Series East. The team is owned by Rick Gdovic and was formed from the assets of Viva Motorsports. After the 2017 season, PPM shuttered its stock car operation to transition to sports car racing.

Xfinity Series

Car No. 46 history

The No. 46 team debut was at the season opener at Daytona International Speedway in 2016, with Anthony Kumpen behind the wheel with sponsorship Nexteer Automotive and Leaseplan. The second race for the No. 46 was the 2016 Fitzgerald Glider Kits 300 at Bristol with Brandon Gdovic behind the wheel with sponsorship Pitt Ohio Express. He started 27th and finished 18th. Gdovic also ran at Pocono, Indianapolis, the other Bristol race and Phoenix. Jordan Anderson drove the car in the season-finale at Homestead-Miami.

In 2017, Kumpen returned to the No. 46 at Daytona and Mid-Ohio Sports Car Course. Where he finished 22nd and 18th. Quin Houff made its Xfinity Series debut in the No. 46 at Bristol, with an impressive 15th-place finish. Houff also ran the following race at Richmond, the spring race at Iowa, the fall race at Kentucky and Kansas. Houff also failed to qualify for the summer race at Kentucky and in the season-finale at Homestead-Miami. Parker Kligerman drove the car at Road America and finished 10th, giving the team their first Top-10.

Car No. 55 history
Brandon Gdovic drove two races in the No. 55 for Viva Motorsports before PPM purchased their equipment.

The team made their first Xfinity Series debut in 2015, at Watkins Glen, with Gdovic driving and finished a career best 13th. Anthony Kumpen signed with PPM to drive two races starting at Phoenix International Raceway and Homestead-Miami Speedway.

Sports car racing 
The team announced in early December 2017 that it would be suspending its NASCAR operations and moving into the Continental Tire SportsCar Challenge and posted the sale of its Xfinity Series equipment. Later, team owner Rick Gdovic said that his son Brandon Gdovic wanted to move to sports car racing, and that the financial model in that discipline is better than stock car racing. Rick had tried to sell the team before the 2017 season began but an investment group set to buy the team fell through. In 2018, the team fielded two entries in the Lamborghini Super Trofeo North America series before expanding to the WeatherTech SportsCar Championship for 2019.

References

External links
 

NASCAR Xfinity Series
WeatherTech SportsCar Championship teams
NASCAR teams